Achyronas Liopetriou is a Cypriot football club based in Liopetri. Founded in 1956, the club has played in the Cypriot Second, Third, and Fourth Divisions.

Current squad

For recent transfers, see List of Cypriot football transfers summer 2021.

Honours
 Cypriot Third Division:
 Champions (1): 2020

 Cypriot Fourth Division:
 Champions (3): 1987, 1991, 2007

References

Football clubs in Cyprus
Association football clubs established in 1960
1960 establishments in Cyprus